The Academia Salvadoreña de la Lengua (Spanish for Salvadoran Academy of Language) is an association of academics and experts on the use of the Spanish language in El Salvador.
It was founded in San Salvador on October 19, 1876. It is a member of the Association of Spanish Language Academies.

Spanish language academies
Salvadoran culture
Organizations established in 1876
1876 establishments in El Salvador